Yakhini is an Orthodox moshav in southern Israel. Located in the northern Negev desert near the town of Sderot, it falls under the jurisdiction of Sha'ar HaNegev Regional Council.

History
The moshav was founded in 1950 by Jewish immigrants from Yemen, who were brought to Israel during Operation Magic Carpet, when most Yemenite Jews arrived in the country. The moshav is named for one of the sons of Simeon, son of the patriarch Jacob, as it is located in territory that belonged to the Tribe of Simeon in biblical times (Numbers 26:12).)

Yakhini  was  founded on the lands of the depopulated   Palestinian  village of Al-Muharraqa.

References

Moshavim
Populated places established in 1950
Religious Israeli communities
Gaza envelope
Populated places in Southern District (Israel)
Yemeni-Jewish culture in Israel
1950 establishments in Israel